Tyger may refer to:

Arts and entertainment
 "The Tyger", a 1794 poem by the English poet William Blake
 Tyger (album), by Tangerine Dream, 1987
 "Tyger", a song by The Cult from the 2000 album Spirit\Light\Speed
 Ras Tyger, protagonist of Lord Tyger, a 1970 American novel by Philip José Farmer
 Tyger Tiger, or Jessan Hoan, a fictional character in Marvel Comics
 TYGER Security, a fictional security firm in the video game Batman: Arkham City

People
 Tyger Campbell (born 2000), American basketball player
 Tyger Evans (born 2001), American soccer player
 Tyger Drew-Honey (born 1996), English actor, musician, and TV presenter
 Amanda Lucas (fighter) (born 1981), known earlier as an actress as Tyger

Other uses
 Tyger (ship), a 17th century Dutch ship
 , a Royal Navy frigate launched in 1647
 Tyger River, South Carolina, U.S.
 Tyger (heraldry), a heraldic tiger

See also
 
 Tiger (disambiguation)
 Tiger Tiger (disambiguation)
 Tygers of Pan Tang, a heavy metal band
 Tygerberg, a district in the northern suburbs of Cape Town in South Africa